"When You Walk in the Room" is a song written and recorded by Jackie DeShannon. It was initially released as a single on November 23, 1963, as the B-side to "Till You Say You'll Be Mine". It was re-released as an A-side in September 1964, and later included on the album Breakin' It Up on the Beatles Tour. The single charted on the US Billboard Hot 100, peaking at number 99. 

The song has been covered by many other artists including The Searchers, whose version reached number 3 in the UK in 1964. Another version was recorded by Paul Carrack  in 1987.

Content
The song's lyrics attempt to detail the singer's emotions when in the presence of the person he or she loves. There is also an expression of frustration by the singer that he or she cannot manage to tell that person of his or her love.

The song was produced using the "Wall of Sound" method of Phil Spector.

The Searchers version

The Searchers had previously a hit song in early 1964 with "Needles and Pins" recorded by Jackie DeShannon, and they then recorded another of DeShannon's song "When You Walk in the Room". Their version reached No. 35 in the US and No. 3 in the UK. The group also recorded a German version titled "Wenn ich dich seh".

Charts

The Sports version

Australian rock band The Sports released a version of the song as the second single from their debut studio album, Reckless. It reached No. 42 on the Australian Kent Music Report chart.

Track listing
 Side A "When You Walk in the Room" - 2:32
 Side B1 "True Stories" - 2:34
 Side B2 "Taxi Rank" - 2:25

Charts

Stephanie Winslow version

The American country music artist Stephanie Winslow recorded a version of the song, reaching No. 29 on the US country singles chart.

Chart positions

Paul Carrack version

Paul Carrack's version, from his 1987 album One Good Reason, reached No. 90 in the US and No. 48 in the UK.

It was also a Top Ten hit in Australia, peaking at No. 7.

Charts

Year-end charts

Pam Tillis version

In 1994, country music artist Pam Tillis recorded a version for her album Sweetheart's Dance. It was released as a single, peaking at No. 2 on the US Billboard Hot Country Singles & Tracks chart. It was accompanied by a music video (featuring Dick Clark), and depicting Tillis in a mid-1960s appearance on American Bandstand.

Charts

Year-end charts

Personnel
Compiled from liner notes.
 Mike Brignardello — bass guitar
 Mary Chapin Carpenter — background vocals
 Rob Hajacos — fiddle
 Bob DiPiero — 12-string guitar
 Paul Franklin — steel guitar
 George Marinelli — electric guitar
 Steve Nathan — piano
 Brent Mason — electric guitar
 Kim Richey — background vocals
 Pam Tillis — lead vocals
 Biff Watson — acoustic guitar
 Lonnie Wilson — drums

Agnetha Fältskog version

Former ABBA singer Agnetha Fältskog released her version of "When You Walk in the Room" as the second single from her 2004 album, My Colouring Book. The track peaked at number 11 in Sweden and number 34 in the UK, where it remained in the chart for only two weeks. It was remixed by Almighty and SoundFactory.

Charts

References

1964 singles
1978 singles
1987 singles
1994 singles
2004 singles
Jackie DeShannon songs
The Searchers (band) songs
Pam Tillis songs
Agnetha Fältskog songs
Status Quo (band) songs
Songs written by Jackie DeShannon
Stephanie Winslow songs
Paul Carrack songs
1963 songs
Song recordings produced by Christopher Neil
Song recordings produced by Joe Camilleri
Liberty Records singles
Warner Records singles
Curb Records singles
Arista Nashville singles
Pye Records singles
Music videos directed by Steven Goldmann
Song recordings produced by Dick Glasser
Song recordings with Wall of Sound arrangements